Mount Huber is a  summit located two kilometres east of Lake O'Hara in the Bow Range of Yoho National Park, in the Canadian Rockies of British Columbia, Canada. The nearest higher neighbor is Mount Victoria,  to the north-northeast on the Continental Divide. Mount Huber is a secondary summit of Mount Victoria.

History
Named in 1903 by Samuel Allen for Emil Huber, a Swiss climber, who, with Carl Sulzer, were first to climb Mount Sir Donald in the Selkirk Mountains. The first ascent of Mount Huber was made in 1903 by George Collier, E. Tewes, Christian Bohren, and Christian Kaufmann. The mountain's toponym was officially adopted in 1924 by the Geographical Names Board of Canada.

Geology
Mount Huber is composed of sedimentary rock laid down during the Precambrian to Jurassic periods. Formed in shallow seas, this sedimentary rock was pushed east and over the top of younger rock during the Laramide orogeny.

Climate

Based on the Köppen climate classification, Mount Huber is located in a subarctic climate zone with cold, snowy winters, and mild summers. Precipitation runoff from Mount Huber drains into tributaries of the Kicking Horse River which is a tributary of the Columbia River.

Gallery

See also
 List of peaks on the Alberta–British Columbia border
 List of mountains in the Canadian Rockies

References

Notes

External links
 Parks Canada web site: Yoho National Park
 Weather forecast: Mount Huber

Three-thousanders of British Columbia
Canadian Rockies
Mountains of Yoho National Park
Kootenay Land District